Hocus Pocus (stylised as HOCUS POCUS) is the fifth album by Japanese pop singer Kaela Kimura, released on June 24, 2009.The album was released in formats CD and CD with a DVD.

Track listing

References

2009 albums
Kaela Kimura albums
Japanese-language albums